Hotel Vendome is a novel by Danielle Steel, published by Delacorte Press in November 2011. The book is Steel's eighty-fifth novel, and (including non-fiction and children's books) her 103rd book overall.

Plot
This novel tells the story of Hugues Martin, a graduate of the prestigious École hôtelière de Lausanne in Switzerland. He owns the Hotel Vendome, an illustrious hotel located on the Upper East Side of Manhattan in New York City.

Footnotes

2011 American novels
American romance novels

Novels by Danielle Steel
Novels set in hotels
Novels set in New York City
Delacorte Press books